Notre Dame School is an independent Catholic girls day school located in Cobham, Surrey, England. The school includes both a preparatory school and a senior school.

History
Notre Dame School was founded at Burwood House in 1938 by nuns from the Company of Our Lady Mary. In 2003 the school’s ownership passed from The Company of Mary Our Lady to a charitable trust, and is now managed by the trustees and a board of governors, several of whom are Sisters from the religious institute. The present senior school headmistress was appointed in 2003 and the prep school headmistress was appointed in 2019.

Anniversary
Cardinal Cormac Murphy-O'Connor, Archbishop of Westminster, was the main celebrant at a special Mass held at the school to celebrate both the 70th anniversary of the school and 400 years of the Company of Mary Our Lady on Tuesday 15 May 2007.  The Mass was also attended by Archbishop Faustino Sainz Muñoz, Apostolic Nuncio, Bishop Kieran Conry and Bishop Bernard Longley.

Preparatory School

The prep department consists of the NDEY Early Years for boys and girls aged 2 to 4, Infant school for boys and girls aged 4 – 7 and the junior school for girls aged 7–11.

Senior School
 
The Senior School consists of secondary education for girls aged 11 – 6 and ND6 Sixth form for girls ages 16–18

Houses
The pupils of both schools are divided into four Houses, which compete in such things as sport and drama. The Houses are named as follows:

Jeanne (Prep) Eyquem (Senior) 
Michel  (Prep) Montaigne  (Senior) 
Richard  (Prep)   Lestonnac (Senior) 
Gaston  (Prep)  Montferrant  (Senior)

Associations
The school has membership of the Girls' Schools Association, the Incorporated Association of Preparatory Schools and the Catholic Independent Schools' Conference.

Notable former pupils
 Ruth Wilson, Olivier Award - winning actress
 Patsy Ferran Olivier Award - Best actress

References

External links
 School Website
 Profile on MyDaughter
 ISI Inspection Reports - Prep School & Senior School
 GSA Girls' Schools Association (GSA) - Notre Dame School

Private schools in Surrey
Roman Catholic private schools in the Diocese of Arundel and Brighton
Girls' schools in Surrey
Member schools of the Girls' Schools Association
Educational institutions established in 1937
1937 establishments in England